Salpianthus is a genus of flowering plants belonging to the family Nyctaginaceae.

Its native range is Mexico to Venezuela and Ecuador, Cuba.

Species:

Salpianthus aequalis 
Salpianthus arenarius 
Salpianthus macrodontus 
Salpianthus purpurascens 
Salpianthus standleyi

References

Nyctaginaceae
Caryophyllales genera